Leonid Zakharov (born 1930) is a Soviet rower. He competed in the men's coxless four event at the 1956 Summer Olympics.

References

External links

1930 births
Possibly living people
Soviet male rowers
Olympic rowers of the Soviet Union
Rowers at the 1956 Summer Olympics
Place of birth missing (living people)